The seventh season of Alarm für Cobra 11 – Die Autobahnpolizei aired between November 8, 2001 and May 2, 2002.

Format
The main cast didn't change in this season.

Cast
 René Steinke - Tom Kranich
 Erdoğan Atalay - Semir Gerkhan

Episodes

2001 German television seasons
2002 German television seasons